Championship Manager 2007 is a football manager simulation video game developed by Beautiful Game Studios and published by Eidos Interactive. It was released for Microsoft Windows on October 13, 2006, and for PlayStation 2, PlayStation Portable and Xbox 360 on March 16, 2007. It was brought to Mac OS X on May 16, 2007 by Virtual Programming.

Features
As well as the usual seasonal data updates reflecting player movements and competition outcomes, this version of the game sees several new features introduced.

For the PlayStation Portable, PlayStation 2 and Xbox 360, the game introduces two new divisions for the English leagues, the Conference North and Conference South, with up-to-date player statistics for these clubs. Also, for the PSP, numerous features have been introduced such as staff feedback on team selection, and team talks. A new Match Analysis tool has been added to the game which includes many stats for each team and player at the end of a match. A demo has been released on the PC and is available on the Championship Manager website.

The layout and controls of the game, especially on the PlayStation Portable, have been made much more complicated since Championship Manager 2006.

Reception
GameSpot praised the ProZone analysis but noted that the match engine still needs work.

Reviews
VicioJuegos.com / uVeJuegos.com
Eurogamer.net
Jeuxvideo.com
Gamestyle
Jeuxvideo.com
Jeuxvideo.com

See also
Football Manager 2007

References

External links
 Official Championship Manager 2007 website
 Official Championship Manager 2007 demo
 More information about the Macintosh version

2006 video games
Association football management video games
Eidos Interactive games
MacOS games
PlayStation 2 games
PlayStation Portable games
Windows games
Xbox 360 games
Video games developed in the United Kingdom